Clifford Barry (1 June 1946 – 21 August 2021) was a Canadian water polo player. He competed at the 1972 Summer Olympics and the 1976 Summer Olympics. He died in August 2021 at the age of 75.

References

External links
 

1946 births
2021 deaths
Canadian male water polo players
Olympic water polo players of Canada
Water polo players at the 1972 Summer Olympics
Water polo players at the 1976 Summer Olympics
Water polo players from Montreal